Barnett is an unincorporated community in Warren County, in the U.S. state of Georgia.

History
A post office called Barnett was established in 1878, and remained in operation until 1974. In 1900, the community had 381 inhabitants.

References

Unincorporated communities in Warren County, Georgia
Unincorporated communities in Georgia (U.S. state)